Dungworth is a village in South Yorkshire.

Dungworth may also refer to:

John Dungworth, football coach
Richard Dungworth, author